I, a Lover is a 1966 Swedish-Danish comedy film directed by Börje Nyberg and starring Jørgen Ryg.

Cast
 Jørgen Ryg - Peter Isløv
 Jessie Flaws - Elizabeth Schmidt
 Axel Strøbye - Ole Schmidt
 Kerstin Wartel - Sigrid Schmidt
 Marie Ahrle - Beatrice Isløv (as Marie Nylander)
 Ebbe Langberg - Isac Andersen
 Jeanne Darville - Ulla Pauce
 Paul Hagen - Torbjørn Pauce
 Jytte Breuning - Hilda
 Dirch Passer - Mortensen
 Birgitta Fjeldhede
 Sigrid Horne-Rasmussen - Kollega til Peter
 Birger Jensen - Mand i biograf
 Tove Maës - Patient hos Ulla Pauce
 Lise Thomsen - Patient hos Ulla Pauce

External links
 

1966 films
Swedish comedy films
1960s Danish-language films
1966 comedy films
Danish black-and-white films
Swedish black-and-white films
Danish comedy films
Crown International Pictures films
1960s Swedish films